Munawwar Ali Khan (24 December 1924 – 21 October 2013) was a Pakistani cricketer. He played first-class cricket for East Pakistan, Northern India and Sind between 1944 and 1955.

References

External links
 

1924 births
2013 deaths
Pakistani cricketers
East Pakistan cricketers
Northern India cricketers
Sindh cricketers
Cricketers from Lahore